Tabar Castle is a historical castle located in Jahrom County in Fars Province, The longevity of this fortress dates back to the Umayyad dynasty.

References 

Castles in Iran